Nationality words link to articles with information on the nation's poetry or literature (for instance, Irish or France).

Events
George Hickes' Linguarum veterum septentrionalium thesaurus grammatico-criticus et archæologicus vol. 2 (published in Oxford) includes the first published reference to Beowulf and the only surviving transcript of the Finnesburg Fragment.
William Somervile inherits his father's estate, where his participation in field sports will furnish the material for much of his poetry.
William Walsh begins his correspondence with Alexander Pope.

Works published
 Daniel Defoe:
 The Double Welcome: A poem to the Duke of Marlbro
 The Dyet of Poland, published anonymously; a verse history of "Poland" (in fact, Britain) during Queen Anne's first parliament
 John Dennis, The Grounds of Criticism in Poetry*
 Bernard Mandeville, The Grumbling Hive: or Knaves Turned Honest, anonymously published poem (and a piracy) which became immediately popular. In 1714, Mandeville would republish the poem, together with an essay titled An Enquiry into the Origin of Moral Virtue and titled the whole The Fable of the Bees: or Private Vices, Public Benefits. In 1723, he added an attack on charity schools and an essay attacking Shaftesbury. The final version, with a further expansion, was published in 1733.
 John Philips:
 Blenheim, published anonymously
 The Splendid Shilling: An imitation of Milton, published anonymously
 Matthew Prior, An English Padlock, published anonymously
 Quan Tangshi, Chinese anthology
 Edward Ward, Hudibras Redivivus; or, A Burlesque Poem on the Times, published anonymously, in two volumes of 12 parts each; first volume published August 1705 to July 1706; second volume published August 1706 to June 1707
 Isaac Watts, Horae Lyricae, published this year, although book states "1706"
 John Wilmot, Earl of Rochester, Poems on Several Occasions; with Valentinian; a Tragedy, London: Printed for Jacob Tonson, posthumously published

Births
Death years link to the corresponding "[year] in poetry" article:
 January 21 – Isaac Hawkins Browne (died 1760), English poet
 March 20 – Johann Sigismund Scholze (died 1750), German poet
 May – Ambrosius Stub (died 1758), Danish poet
 year uncertain
 Stephen Duck (died 1756), English poet
 Kunchan Nambiar (died 1770), Malayalam language poet, performer and satirist

Deaths
Birth years link to the corresponding "[year] in poetry" article:
 January 10 – Étienne Pavillon (born 1632), French lawyer and poet
 June 10 – Michael Wigglesworth (born 1631), English clergyman and poet in America, "the most popular of early New England poets"

See also

Poetry
List of years in poetry
List of years in literature
 18th century in poetry
 18th century in literature

Notes

18th-century poetry
Poetry
1705 introductions